Carenum speciosum is a species of ground beetle in the subfamily Scaritinae. It was described by Sloane in 1888.

References

splendens
Beetles described in 1888